101 Cars you Must Drive was a Speed TV program hosted by actor and comedian Alonzo Bodden. The premise of the program is that there will be (at least) 101 cars, and that all 5 cars within a particular episode can be linked to one another in some fashion.

Description
The first season consisted of 10 half-hour-long episodes. Bodden drove each of the five described vehicles, with the exceptions of the Chevrolet Nova, 1951 Aerocar, Chrysler K-Car, Ford Bronco, Chevrolet Corvette Mk IV prototype, and the 1955 Chevrolet Bel-Air. Although he did not drive one, Bodden did ride in a Renault R5. 50 vehicles were reviewed by Bodden.

Cancellation
Alonzo Bodden has stated the show has been cancelled by Speed.

Episode list

References

Speed (TV network) original programming
Documentary films about automobiles
2008 American television series debuts
2008 American television series endings